Victor Hugo Soares dos Santos (born 7 March 1997), commonly known as Kanu, is a Brazilian footballer who plays as a defender for Bahia, on loan from Botafogo.

Career statistics

Notes

References

External links

1997 births
Living people
People from Duque de Caxias, Rio de Janeiro
Sportspeople from Rio de Janeiro (state)
Brazilian footballers
Association football defenders
Campeonato Brasileiro Série A players
Campeonato Brasileiro Série B players
Botafogo de Futebol e Regatas players
Associação Desportiva Cabofriense players
Esporte Clube Bahia players